Nationalism in the United Kingdom may refer to:
 British nationalism
 Cornish nationalism
 English nationalism
 Irish nationalism
 Scottish nationalism
 Ulster nationalism
 Welsh nationalism